M.A. Kharafi & Sons (Mohammed Abdulmohsin Al-Kharafi & Sons W.L.L.) is a private company based in Kuwait with a variety of commercial interests and revenues for 2006 estimated at $3.3 billion. The company was run by Nasser Al-Kharafi until his death in 2011. On April 15, 2006, the US doughnut retailer Krispy Kreme announced that MA Kharafi & Sons bought a 6.7 percent stake or 4.13 million shares. Al-Kharafi is also a supplier and integrator to the newspaper industry in Kuwait.
In 2011 the Kharafi family was listed at 77th position in the Forbes magazine's list of the richest people in the world.

The company started in 1956 as a contracting company founded by Mohamed Abdul Mohsen Al Kharafi.

The company sold its shares in Americana in 2016 for $2.3 billion, which was for fast-food-chains business that operated KFC, Hardee's and other brands in Kuwait and several other Middle Eastern countries.

In May 2015, Fawzi M.Al-Kharafi was delegated and assigned by the family as a chairman and president. He died in 2021.

Organization structure and related entities

As of 30 March 2008

Subsidiaries, associates and affiliates

Investments

Companies under management

Developments and Projects

See also

References

External links
 Official Website

Companies based in Kuwait City
Conglomerate companies of Kuwait
Conglomerate companies established in 1956
Kuwaiti families